Asius or Asios may refer to:

 Asius (mythology), one of two people in Greek mythology
 Asius of Samos, ancient Greek genealogical poet
 Asius (wasp), a genus of wasp in the family Cryptinae
 Asios (beetle), a genus of beetle in the family Carabidae
 11554 Asios, an asteroid
 a member of the ancient Asii tribe